Dmitriy Barmashov (born September 25, 1985 in Oskemen) is a Kazakh freestyle skier, specializing in  moguls.

Barmashov competed at the 2010 Winter Olympics for Kazakhstan. He did not advance to the moguls final, placing 29th in the qualifying round.

As of March 2013, his best showing at the World Championships is 17th, in the 2005 dual moguls event.

Barmashov made his World Cup debut in December 2005. As of March 2013, his best finish is 8th, in a dual moguls event at Deer Valley in 2011/12. His best World Cup overall finish is 29th, in 2008/09 and 2011/12.

References

1988 births
Living people
Olympic freestyle skiers of Kazakhstan
Freestyle skiers at the 2010 Winter Olympics
Freestyle skiers at the 2014 Winter Olympics
Sportspeople from Oskemen
Kazakhstani male freestyle skiers
Asian Games medalists in freestyle skiing
Freestyle skiers at the 2011 Asian Winter Games
Freestyle skiers at the 2017 Asian Winter Games
Asian Games gold medalists for Kazakhstan
Asian Games bronze medalists for Kazakhstan
Medalists at the 2011 Asian Winter Games